The Theaterpathologisches Institut is a theatrical project located in Hamburg, Germany founded by Roland Reber in 1981.

Theatre companies in Germany